Roeser is a surname. Notable people with the surname include:

Andy Roeser (born 1959), American basketball executive
Donald Roeser (born 1947), American guitarist, singer, songwriter and founding member of Blue Oyster Cult.
Jack Roeser (1923–2014), American engineer, inventor, entrepreneur, businessman and civic leader
Nic Roeser (1896–1997), Luxembourgian gymnast 
Tom Roeser (1928–2011), American writer and broadcaster